Vivian Jovanni (born August 17, 1995) is an American actress and former model. She is known for portraying the role of Ciara Brady on the NBC soap opera, Days of Our Lives.

Early life
Jovanni was born in Houston, Texas to Laura and Edward Pupo, Cuban immigrants of Spanish and Italian descent. She has two brothers, Daniel and Christian, who is her twin.

Career
Jovanni is managed by Dreamscope Entertainment. Before moving to Los Angeles to pursue her acting career, she worked as a model, and in 2013 was named Female Fitness Model of the Year by International Modeling and Talent Association. In 2014, she made her acting debut when she landed the guest-starring role in the series The Bay.

In April 2015, Days of Our Lives sent out a casting call for the role of Ciara Brady using the code name Danielle, describing the character as a 16-17 year old girl who has experienced a lot of pain in her life. In October 2015, it was announced that Jovanni had won the role, which had been previously played by child actress Lauren Boles. Jovanni made her on-screen debut on October 30, 2015. three-months later, in January 2016, she was pre-nominated in the  43rd Daytime Emmy Awards for her work on the show. In December 2016, Serial Scoop announced Jovanni was leaving the soap, by way of a "mutual decision" between her and the soap.

Filmography

References

External links
 
 

American film actresses
American television actresses
1995 births
American soap opera actresses
Living people
Actresses from Houston
21st-century American women